Wahb is a male Arabic given name that means "gift". This name is not to be confused with Al-Wahhab (الوهاب) (The Bestower) which is one of the 99 names of God.

People named Wahb include:
Vaballathus - Emperor of Palmyra
Wahb ibn 'Abd Manaf
Wahb ibn Munabbih
Wahb ibn Umayr
Wahb ibn Sa'd

People using it in their patronymic include:
Aminah bint Wahb
Halah bint Wahb
Umayr ibn Wahb

See also 
Arabic name
Abdul Wahhab